This page describes the qualifying procedure for the 1986 UEFA European Under-16 Football Championship. 28 teams were divided into 13 groups of two and three teams each. The twelve best winners advanced to the final tournament.

Results

Group 1

Group 2

Group 3

Group 4

Group 5

Group 6

Group 7

Group 8

Group 9

Group 10

Group 11

Group 12

Group 13

References

External links
UEFA.com
RSSSF.com

Qualifying
UEFA European Under-17 Championship qualification